Antoine Camilleri (born 20 August 1965) is a Maltese prelate of the Catholic Church who served as the Under-Secretary for Relations with States in the Secretariat of State of the Holy See, until he was named an archbishop and given the title of apostolic nuncio in 2019. He joined the diplomatic service of the Holy See in 1999.

Biography
Camilleri was born in Sliema, Malta on 20 August 1965. He attended St. Joseph's School, Sliema, and St. Aloysius' College, Birkirkara. He graduated Doctor of Laws from the University of Malta in 1988.

He was ordained to the priesthood on 5 July 1991 and was incardinated into the Archdiocese of Malta. He served as vice parish priest at Our Lady of Mount Carmel Church, Gzira (1991–92). To study canon law he entered the Pontifical Lateran University in 1992 and obtained a doctorate. In 1996 he was appointed Defender of the Bond at the Archdiocesan Ecclesiastical Tribunal (1996–97) of Malta.

He attended the Pontifical Ecclesiastical Academy and on 9 January 1999 joined the diplomatic service of the Holy See. He served in the Apostolic Nunciatures in Papua New Guinea (1999–2002), Uganda (2002–05), and Cuba (2005–06), and then in Rome in the offices of the Secretariat of State.

On 22 February 2013, a few days before the resignation of Pope Benedict XVI from the papacy, he was appointed to replace Ettore Balestrero as Under-Secretary for Relations with States. In that position, roughly equivalent to that of a deputy foreign minister, he played a role in negotiations with many nations, including Israel, Palestine, China, and Vietnam. Speaking on 27 February 2019 at a debate on migration at the United Nations, he said:

On 3 September 2019, Pope Francis named him titular archbishop of Skálholt and gave him the title of apostolic nuncio. He received his episcopal consecration from Francis on 4 October. On 31 October, Pope Francis named him apostolic nuncio to Ethiopia and Djibouti, special representative at the African Union, and apostolic delegate to Somalia.

See also
 List of heads of the diplomatic missions of the Holy See

References

 

1959 births
Living people
20th-century Maltese Roman Catholic priests
Pontifical Ecclesiastical Academy alumni
Pontifical Lateran University alumni
Apostolic Nuncios to Djibouti
Apostolic Nuncios to Ethiopia
Apostolic Nuncios to Somalia
Roman Catholic titular archbishops
Diplomats of the Holy See